Azeri (Azerbaijani: Azəri) is an offshore oil field in the Caspian Sea, located  east of Baku, Azerbaijan and is a part of the larger Azeri-Chirag-Guneshli  (ACG) project. The Azeri field includes Central Azeri, West Azeri, East Azeri production platforms compression and water injection platform (C&WP).  The field was discovered in 1988 and originally it was named after 26 Baku Commissars.

Central Azeri
Central Azeri is a production, drilling and quarters (PDQ) platform located in nearly  depth of water in the central part of the Azeri field.
The facilities on Central Azeri include:
a 48-slot PDQ platform
a  oil pipeline from the platform to the receiving Sangachal Terminal
a  gas pipeline from the platform to Sangachal Terminal.
Central Azeri has started its operations in February 2005

West Azeri
West Azeri is a production, drilling and quarters (PDQ) platform located in  depth of water and was constructed to produce oil from western section of Azeri field. West Azeri adds  to the overall ACG production.
The facilities on West Azeri include:
a 48-slot PDQ platform
a  oil pipeline from the platform to receiving Sangachal terminal
The platform has started its operations in December 2005.

East Azeri

East Azeri is a production, drilling and quarters (PDQ) platform located in  depth of water and was constructed to produce oil from eastern section of Azeri field. East Azeri produces .
The facilities on East Azeri include:
a 48-slot PDQ platform
The platform has started its operations in October 2006.

Compression and water injection platform (C&WP)
The C&WP supplies Central, West and East Azeri platforms with water and gas injection services, manages gas export and provides electrical power using 10 Rolls-Royce turbines. The platform is bridge linked to Central Azeri platform.

Gas injection capacity at C&WP is  utilizing 5 gas injection wells. Water injection capacity is  utilizing 12 water injection wells. Azeri C&WP has some of the largest water injection pumps and gas injection compressors among BP platforms worldwide. The topsides have been constructed in the ATA (AMEC-Azfen-Tekfen) construction yard in Bibi-Heybat, Azerbaijan.

2008 gas leak and blowout
On 17 September 2008, a gas leak was discovered in the area of the Central Azeri platform after blowout in a gas-injection well.  The platform was shut down and the staff was evacuated.  As the West Azeri Platform was being powered by a cable from the Central Azeri Platform, it was also shut down.  BP, an operator of ACG, suspected a bad cement job caused the leaking gas.  Production at the West Azeri Platform resumed on 9 October 2008 and at the Central Azeri Platform in December 2008.

See also

Azeri-Chirag-Guneshli
Baku–Tbilisi–Ceyhan pipeline
Sangachal Terminal
South Caucasus Pipeline
Baku-Supsa pipeline
Baku–Novorossiysk pipeline
Nabucco pipeline
Baku-Novo Filya gas pipeline
Nakhichevan field

References

External links
Image showing Chirag within ACG fields

Oil fields of Azerbaijan
Oil fields of the Soviet Union
Caspian Sea
BP oil and gas fields